Ireneo Paz Flores (1836–1924) was a prominent Mexican liberal intellectual, writer and journalist, who is the grandfather of the Nobel Prize-winning Mexican writer Octavio Paz.  He was born July 3, 1836, in Guadalajara, Mexico.  In 1861 upon completion of his college studies, he was licensed to practice law.  He married Rosa Solórzano.  Their children included: Octavio (Sr.), Arturo, and Amalia.  He died in Mixcoac in 1924.  During his tenure as editor of La Patria Ilustrada, he became the first regular employer of famed Mexican cartoonist José Guadalupe Posada.  Among Paz' numerous writings were works on the legendary California bandit Joaquin Murrieta, and the near-legendary historical figure Malinche.

Mr. Paz wrote  35 books which included different genres such as fiction, play-writing, comedy, memoirs and poetry.

Even though  Ireneo Paz  died  when Octavio Paz was ten years old, he had an important influence on his decision for being a writer.

References
 
Biografia de Ireneo Paz at www.biografiasyvidas.com
La vida moral e intelectual de su abuelo, raíz de la obra de Octavio Paz. (entrevista con el historiador Napoleón Rodríguez quien habla sobre Ireneo Paz, ... at findarticles.com
HISTORY OF MEXICO - OCTAVIO PAZ: NOBEL WINNER AND NOBLE MAN - BY JIM TUCK IN MEXICO CONNECT at www.mexconnect.com

 Vida y Aventuras del Mas Celebre Bandido Sonorense, Joaquin Murrieta: Sus Grandes Proezas En California, by Ireneo Paz, Mexico City, 1904; first English translation by Francis P. Belle, Regan Pub. Corp., Chicago, 1925.  Republished with intro. and further translation by Luis Leal, Life and Adventures of the Celebrated Bandit Joaquin Murrieta: His Exploits in the State of California, Arte Publico Press, 1999.
Amor y suplicio (1873) re: Malinche
Doña Marina (1883) also re: Malinche

Mexican male writers
Writers from Jalisco
1861 births
1924 deaths